Il Progresso Italo-Americano was an Italian-language daily newspaper in the United States, published in New York City from 1880 to 1988, when it was shut down due to a union dispute. In 1989, most journalists of Il Progresso reunited to create a new daily, America Oggi. In the early 20th century Il Progresso was the most popular of New York's Italian newspapers, selling anywhere from 90,000 to 100,000 copies every day.

Founded in 1879 by Carlo Barsotti and Vincenzo Polidori, who were also the first editors, Il Progresso Italo-Americano was a bully pulpit for raising funds for monuments by public subscription in the city of New York. From 1888 to 1921 it promoted monuments to Giuseppe Garibaldi, Christopher Columbus, Giuseppe Verdi, Giovanni da Verrazzano and Dante.

Generoso Pope assumed the direction of the newspaper in 1928, after buying it for $2,052,000. He doubled its circulation to 200,000 in New York City, making it the largest Italian-language daily in the country. The newspaper from 1889-1976 is now available on microfilm at the John D. Calandra Italian American Institute in NYC.

In May 2022, New York-based North Sixth Group invested in the revival of Il Progresso Italo-Americano and integrated it into America Domani, or America Tomorrow, a digital media community for Italian Americans. Publishing industry veteran Al DiGuido was named Publisher & CEO.

References

Newspapers established in 1880
Publications disestablished in 1988
Italian-language newspapers published in the United States
Italian-American culture in New York City
Defunct newspapers published in New York City
Non-English-language newspapers published in New York (state)
1880 establishments in New York (state)
1988 disestablishments in New York (state)
Daily newspapers published in New York City